The Beipu Citian Temple is a Buddhist temple in Beipu Township, Hsinchu County, Taiwan.

History
The Taiwanese aborigines had been a fierce rebel force in the early days in the development of Beipu. In order to pray for peace within the local communities, a small temple dedicated to the Guanyin was built by farmers and developers in the area. The temple was reconstructed in wood in 1846, followed by an expansion to the scale it is today.

See also
 Buddhism in Taiwan
 Religion in Taiwan
 List of temples in Taiwan

References

1846 establishments in Taiwan
Religious buildings and structures completed in 1846
Buddhist temples in Taiwan
Tourist attractions in Hsinchu County
Temples in Hsinchu County
Mazu temples in Taiwan